Takis Papoulidis (5 December 1934 – 5 September 1998) was a Greek footballer. He played in 21 matches for the Greece national football team from 1957 to 1965.

References

External links
 

1934 births
1998 deaths
Greek footballers
Greece international footballers
Place of birth missing
Association footballers not categorized by position